San Marino competed at the 1992 Summer Olympics in Barcelona, Spain. Seventeen competitors, sixteen men and one woman, took part in fifteen events in seven sports.

Competitors
The following is the list of number of competitors in the Games.

Archery

In its debut Olympic archery competition, San Marino was represented by one man.  He did not advance to the elimination rounds.

Athletics

Men's 100m metres
Dominique Canti
 Heat — 11.14 (→ did not advance)

Men's 4 × 100 m metres Relay
Nicola Selva, Manlio Molinari, Dominique Canti, and Aldo Canti
 Heat — 42.08 (→ did not advance)

Men's Marathon
Gian Luigi Macina
 Final — 2:30.45 (66)

Cycling

One male cyclist represented San Marino in 1992.

Men's road race
 Guido Frisoni

Judo

Shooting

Swimming

Men's 50m Freestyle
 Filippo Piva
 Heat – 26.41 (→ did not advance, 66th place)
 Roberto Pellandra
 Heat – 26.51 (→ did not advance, 67th place)

Men's 200m Freestyle
 Daniele Casadei
 Heat – 2:06.14 (→ did not advance, 52nd place)

Men's 100m Breaststroke
 Danilo Zavoli
 Heat – 1:09.65 (→ did not advance, 50th place)

Men's 200m Breaststroke
 Danilo Zavoli
 Heat – 2:34.87 (→ did not advance, 47th place)

Women's 50m Freestyle
 Sara Casadei
 Heat – 30.05 (→ did not advance, 49th place)

Tennis

Men's Doubles Competition
 Christian Forcellini and Gabriel Francini
 First round — Lost to Anastasios Bavelas and Konstantinos Efraimoglou (Greece) 1–6, 1–6, 2-6

References

External links
Official Olympic Reports

Nations at the 1992 Summer Olympics
1992
Summer Olympics